Żyliński, feminine: Żylińska is a Polish-language surname. The Lithuanian-language form is Žilinskas. The Russian-language form is Zhilinsky. The noble  belong to Polish, Lithuanian and Russian nobilities.

Notable people with this surname include:

Jadwiga Żylińska
Joanna Żylińska
Tadeusz Żyliński

References

Polish-language surnames